Ingerana tenasserimensis (common names: Tenasserim eastern frog, pale-headed frog) is a species of frog in the family Dicroglossidae.
It is found in Myanmar, western and peninsular Thailand, and adjacent Peninsular Malaysia.

Ingerana tenasserimensis inhabit the forest floor near streams in closed-canopy rainforests. They are also found in older rubber plantations.

References

tenasserimensis
Amphibians of Myanmar
Amphibians of Malaysia
Amphibians of Thailand
Taxa named by William Lutley Sclater
Amphibians described in 1892
Taxonomy articles created by Polbot